Eric DuBose (born May 15, 1976) is an American former professional baseball pitcher. He bats and throws left-handed and attended Mississippi State University. Currently, Dubose serves as a Director for East Coast Sox Baseball Organization, an elite nationally known showcase organization based out of the southeast.
 
However, when the Baltimore Orioles needed a spot starter for a game against the Royals in May , they recalled DuBose from Triple-A Ottawa and he did not disappoint, tossing 6 innings of 3-hit, 2-run ball. DuBose spent most of 2003 in the bullpen, though he was made a full-time starter in September. DuBose finished '03 with a 3–6 record and 3.79 ERA in 17 games.

In  the struggles continued – DuBose was ineffective in 15 games, walking more batters than he struck out. After signing a minor league contract with the Colorado Rockies before the start of the  season, DuBose was released on May 15, 2007.

DuBose signed with the Cleveland Indians in late May 2007, spending the season with the Buffalo Bisons of the International League. For the  season, he played for the independent Bridgeport Bluefish of the Atlantic League before his contract was purchased by the Los Angeles Dodgers on August 3, 2008; he was assigned to Double-A Jacksonville. On August 27, he was promoted to Triple-A Las Vegas and became a free agent at the end of the season.

References

External links

1976 births
Living people
Akron Aeros players
American expatriate baseball players in Canada
Baseball players from Florida
Baltimore Orioles players
Bowie Baysox players
Bridgeport Bluefish players
Buffalo Bisons (minor league) players
Colorado Springs Sky Sox players
Huntsville Stars players
Jacksonville Suns players
Las Vegas 51s players
Major League Baseball pitchers
Midland RockHounds players
Mississippi State Bulldogs baseball players
Ottawa Lynx players
Rochester Red Wings players
Southern Oregon Timberjacks players
Sportspeople from Bradenton, Florida
Visalia Oaks players